Ho Pui Reservoir is an irrigation reservoir in Hong Kong, managed by Water Supplies Department.

The water of the Ho Pui Reservoir is used for irrigating agricultural lands in the northwest New Territories.

The Ho Pui Reservoir Family Walk has been noted for its beautiful bamboo grove.

See also
 List of reservoirs of Hong Kong
 Ho Pui (Yuen Long District)

References

External links

 Hong Kong Water Supply – Irrigation Reservoirs at industrialhistoryhk.org

Reservoirs in Hong Kong
Yuen Long District